Nedev Peak is the rocky peak rising to 459 m at the southeast extremity of Rugate Ridge on Oscar II Coast in Graham Land, Antarctica. It surmounts Evans Glacier on the southwest, Musina Glacier on the northwest and Vaughan Inlet on the east.

The feature is named after Konstantin Nedev, mechanic at St. Kliment Ohridski base during the 2009/10 and subsequent Bulgarian Antarctic campaigns.

Location

Maps
 Antarctic Digital Database (ADD). Scale 1:250000 topographic map of Antarctica. Scientific Committee on Antarctic Research (SCAR). Since 1993, regularly upgraded and updated

Notes

References
 Nedev Peak. SCAR Composite Gazetteer of Antarctica
 Bulgarian Antarctic Gazetteer. Antarctic Place-names Commission. (details in Bulgarian, basic data in English)

External links
 Nedev Peak. Adjusted Copernix satellite image

Mountains of Graham Land
Oscar II Coast
Bulgaria and the Antarctic